"The Enduring Chill" is a short story by Flannery O'Connor. It was written in 1958 and published in 1965 in her short story collection Everything That Rises Must Converge. After suffering for many years, O'Connor died of lupus at the age of 39. A devout Roman Catholic, O'Connor often used religious themes in her work.

Plot summary 
The story about Asbury, a writer from New York who returns home to his mother's farm in the Southern United States after coming down with a serious illness. He is out of money, unsuccessful, and believes he is dying. His mother finds a local doctor, Dr. Block, who draws some of Asbury's blood to examine. In bed Asbury thinks about various experiences, including one the prior year when he interacted with the African-American farm hands and, in a show of rebellion against his mother, smoked cigarettes with them in the dairy barn. He also drank raw milk, but the farm hands refuse to drink the milk, saying that's one thing Asbury's mother doesn't allow. He tried to convince the hands to do this for several days without success, and later hears them talking about him behind his back. Asbury reflects on the time he met a Jesuit priest at a lecture in New York, and asks that his mother bring a priest to him against her wishes. She complies but the priest is elderly, hard of hearing, and not the intellectual that Asbury hoped for. The priest gives Asbury an angry lecture about his failure to say his prayers and learn the Catechism. Though Asbury doesn't believe, this experience leaves him scared and shaken. Asbury then requests to see the African-American farm hands so that he may have a meaningful experience before he dies. Asbury gives them both cigarettes, the farm hands lie to him by telling him he looks well, and they bicker between themselves over the most effective remedy for a cold. Asbury finds this interaction disappointing. After Asbury awakens from a deep sleep, Dr. Block arrives at the house and informs Asbury that he has undulant fever. His mother speculates that he probably got it from drinking raw milk at the dairy. The illness will not kill him but will continually recur and cause him pain. Asbury is disappointed that he will not die a tragic death.

References

Short stories by Flannery O'Connor
1958 short stories
Southern Gothic short stories
Short stories about writers
Farms in fiction